The Hoopeston Wind Farm is a 49-turbine wind farm in northern Vermilion County in the U.S. state of Illinois.   Investment capital for the project was organized by IKEA, which did so to earn clean-energy tax credits for the stores that it operates.  IKEA hired Apex Clean Energy to build the complex.

Detail
The Hoopeston complex's 49 wind turbines, each rated at 2.0 mW, can generate up to 98.0 megawatts of electricity.  The Hoopeston-area project was constructed by Apex Clean Energy, and became operational in 2015.

References

Buildings and structures in Vermilion County, Illinois
Energy infrastructure completed in 2015
Wind farms in Illinois